Leah Diane Gibson (born January 3, 1985) is a Canadian film and television actress.

Early life
Leah Gibson was born in Victoria, British Columbia. She has a twin sister named Erin. She began dancing at the age of four, which led to training and performance in vocational interests, such as ballet and many forms of jazz. In early years of dancing and singing, she discovered musical theatre. She transferred to a high school that specialized in fine arts, maintaining honor-roll grades and graduating at the top of her class.

Gibson studied psychology at the University of Victoria, among the select few who were asked to study under the UVic honours program. She was simultaneously cast in her first professional theatre production, and withdrew from university. The touring company lost its funding within 2 months, and the show was canceled. Gibson consequently moved to Vancouver in pursuit of a career in film acting.

Career
In 2007, Gibson began her acting career in television, appearing on Psych, in the television film Second Sight, and on the miniseries Tin Man. She also played Penelope in Odysseus: Voyage to the Underworld (2008). Gibson's very first lead role in a feature film, namely Amy Singer in The Devil's Ground (2009), was booked within six months of signing an agent. That same year, she portrayed the supporting role of Silhouette's Girlfriend in Zack Snyder's Watchmen, as well as a role in Happy to Be Here (2009). She continued her television career in Stranger with My Face (2009), and appeared as the character Hannah in two episodes of Riese (2009). In 2010, Gibson played Nettie in The Twilight Saga: Eclipse, and was also attached to the cast of A Night for Dying Tigers. From 2010 to 2011, she starred in the two short films The Metal Box (2010) and The Fence (2011). In 2010, she also played a minor character in the TV movie called Betwixt. Gibson portrayed the avatar Emmanuelle on Caprica (2010), which accredited three episodes. She then made a guest appearance as Palomino on Supernatural in the episode "Two Minutes to Midnight". In 2011, she was credited in Rise of the Planet of the Apes as playing Alyssa Williams. Subsequent television credits included He Loves Me (2011) and Soldiers of the Apocalypse (2011). She played supporting characters in Kill for Me (2013) as Natalie Ross, Indie Jonesing (2012) as Gina, and lead role in the short film Leave Us Alone (2012). In the course of five episodes, she has played Candi Lussier in a recurring role on Arctic Air (2012–2013). Gibson's work for the rest of 2012 consisted of episodes on The True Heroines, and the pilot episode for American Housewife.

Filmography

Awards and nominations

References

External links
 

1985 births
Living people
University of Victoria alumni
Actresses from Victoria, British Columbia
Canadian film actresses
Canadian television actresses
21st-century Canadian actresses
Canadian twins